John D. Harvey (born June 3, 1968) is a horror novelist, screenwriter, and freelance writer. He holds a bachelor's degree in creative writing and in journalism. He lives in Rhode Island.

Bibliography 
His articles have appeared in periodicals including Providence Film Notes, Newport This Week, The Traveler Newspaper, The Boston Irish Reporter, and Irish Music Magazine.

Short stories and poems
The Blood Review, April 1990 (poem – "Graceful")
The Leading Edge #22, 1990 (short story – "Robots & Diapers")
Mindmares, Summer 1998 (short story – "The Dull Lord Hornsby")

Novels
The Cleansing (2002)

External links 
John D. Harvey Official Website

1968 births
Living people
American horror novelists
American male novelists
20th-century American novelists
Novelists from Massachusetts
Writers from Boston
20th-century American male writers